Beginning in July 2022, a series of explosions and fires occurred on the Russian-occupied Crimean Peninsula from where the Russian Army had launched its offensive on Southern Ukraine during the Russian invasion of Ukraine. Occupied Crimea was a base for the subsequent Russian occupation of Kherson Oblast and Russian occupation of Zaporizhzhia Oblast. The Ukrainian government has not accepted responsibility for all of the attacks.

Timeline

2022

July 
On the morning of 31 July, a drone with an explosive device attacked the headquarters of the Black Sea Fleet in Sevastopol. 6 people were injured. Due to the attack on the city, all festivities on the occasion of Navy Day were cancelled. Ukrainian officials denied involvement in the attack, but pointed out the weakness of Russia's air defense system in Crimea.

August 

On 9 August, a series of large explosions occurred at the Saky airbase in the city of Novofedorivka, Crimea. Reportedly, one person was killed and 13 were injured. 7 planes were destroyed and 3 were damaged, according to satellite imagery. The military base had been seized by Russian forces during the 2014 annexation of Crimea. At first Ukraine denied any responsibility with presidential aide, Mykhailo Podolyak saying "Of course not. What do we have to do with this?" Later, the commander of Ukrainian forces, Valeriy Zaluzhnyi claimed that it had been a Ukrainian rocket attack.

On 16-17 August, the Armed Forces of Ukraine allegedly carried out a series of acts of sabotage in the Dzhankoy district at an ammunition depot near the village of Majskoye and at an electricity substation in Dzhankoy itself. Two people were injured. According to the mayor of Melitopol, Ivan Fedorov, following the explosions, the occupying authorities of Crimea began an evacuation. with around 2,000 people being reportedly evacuated. Sergey Aksyonov, one of the heads of the Russian authorities in crimea, announced the containment of a zone with a radius of 5 km from the epicenter of the explosion and the evacuation of the population from this zone.

On the morning of August 21, explosions were heard in Sevastopol, Crimean authorities claimed that it was the work of air defense. On the next day, explosions rang out again in the city, the occupation authorities announced that a drone had been shot down. On August 23, several explosions were heard, the anti-aircraft missile system also went off near the city, the governor of Sevastopol, Mikhail Razvozhayev, said that a drone was shot down over the sea. On August 26, the anti-aircraft defense system was activated in the village Novoozerne near Yevpatoria.

September 
On September 7, several explosions rang out in Yevpatoria. The occupation authorities of the Russian Federation in the region announced the activation of air defense and the destruction of several drones. On September 21, a maritime drone was discovered on Soldatsky Beach in Kozacha Bay, Sevastopol. It was examined, then towed out to sea and blown up. On September 26, a series of explosions occurred in Yalta, Gurzuf and Simferopol, anti-air systems allegedly went off during the explosions.

October 

On 1 October, there were explosions at the Belbek military airport near Sevastopol, the air defense system allegedly shot down a drone in the area. On 8 October at around 6:00am, an explosion occurred on the Crimean bridge. It caused two lanes of the roadway to collapse and tanks on a train on the rail bridge to catch fire. Later in the day a single lane for motor vehicles was opened with alternating directions and a ferry provided for heavy goods vehicles. Rail traffic also recommenced. The attack on the bridge was claimed by Putin to be the reason for the October 2022 missile strikes on Ukraine. On 27 October, a power plant in Balaklava, Sevastopol region, was reportedly attacked, causing minor damage, no casualties were reported.

Drone attack on Sevastopol

On 29 October the Sevastopol Naval Base, occupied by Russia, was attacked by unmanned surface vehicles and aerial drones. According to the Russian TASS, at 4:20 am on October 29, a strong explosion sounded, after which several more "claps" were heard. Videos began to circulate in Telegram channels showing black smoke over Sevastopol and explosions could be heard. Nine UAVs and seven USVs took part in the attack, according to Russian officials. GeoConfirmed analysts believe that between six and eight drones participated in the attack on Russian ships and that they hit at least three ships; two naval drones were most likely destroyed. One of the ships that appeared to be damaged in videos was the Admiral Makarov, Russia's Black Sea Fleet new flagship, following the sinking of the Moskva.

Following the attacks the Russian authorities shut down broadcast from the city's surveillance cameras, saying that they "give the enemy an opportunity to detect the city's defense systems", and prohibited entry of boats into the Sevastopol Bay. Russia accused Ukraine and the United Kingdom of being involved in the preparation of the attacks, with Russian representatives saying that the attack was "carried out under the leadership of British specialists who are in the city of Ochakiv (Mykolaiv region) of Ukraine", Russian authorities also claimed that the same unit of "British specialists" was involved in the "terrorist act in the Baltic Sea", when the gas pipelines "Nord Stream" and "Nord Stream - 2" were blown up. The UK Ministry of Defence responded, saying Russia was "peddling lies on an epic scale". After the attack, Russia suspended its participation in the Black Sea Grain Initiative for four days. Grain ships continued to sail from Ukraine despite the Russian announcement. Before these events, Ukraine had warned about possible Russian plans to withdraw from the agreement.

November 
On November 22, several explosions were reported on Sevastopol, witnesses reported that anti-air systems activated, maritime traffic had to be stopped as a result. local officials later reported that 2 drones had been destroyed during the alleged attack, and that another attack had been repelled over the Black Sea, no casualties or significant damage were reported.

December 
On December 10, explosions were reported in Sevastopol, anti-air systems reportedly activated. On December 30, explosions were reported yet again in Sevastopol, anti air systems and Russian planes reportedly intercepted a rocket over the sea.

2023

January 
On January 2, explosions were reported in Sevastopol, anti-air systems activated and two drone were reportedly destroyed over the sea, according to Russian authorities. January 3, Explosions were reported again in Dzhankoy, anti-air systems reportedly activated, witnesses also reported the destruction of some type of "target". On January 15, more explosions were reported in Sevastopol, anti-air systems activated and allegedly destroyed one drone above the Sevastopol Bay, according to local authorities.

See also
 2022 Ukrainian southern counteroffensive
 History of Crimea
 Timeline of the 2022 Russian invasion of Ukraine

References 

Events in Crimea
Southern Ukraine campaign